Rozhdestveno is a rural locality (a village) in Denyatinskoye Rural Settlement, Melenkovsky District, Vladimir Oblast, Russia. The population was 131 as of 2010.

Geography 
Rozhdestveno is located 27 km north of Melenki (the district's administrative centre) by road. Papulino is the nearest rural locality.

References 

Rural localities in Melenkovsky District